Harvey Walden IV (born December 21, 1966) is a former United States Marine drill instructor, author, actor and television host.

Military career 
Walden was born in Chicago, Illinois, and joined the U.S. Marine Corps at age 17. He served as a drill instructor at MCRD, Parris Island, South Carolina and retired from active duty in September 2007 at the rank of first sergeant.

Post-active duty 
Walden is best known in the UK and US for his role as the expert fitness instructor on VH1's and ITV's prime-time shows Fat Club and Celebrity Fit Club.

In the 2007 season of Fit Club, during a heated exchange, contestant Dustin Diamond (the actor commonly known as Screech from Saved by the Bell) challenged Walden to "physical combat". Walden responded to the challenge after Dustin refused to follow their diet and exercise plans.

He is a father of two children; one boy, Harvey V, and one girl, Tiyauna Denise.

References

External links 

United States Marines
Male actors from Chicago
1966 births
African-American United States Navy personnel
Living people
21st-century African-American people
20th-century African-American people